The 1924 Lorain–Sandusky tornado was a deadly F4 tornado which struck the towns of Sandusky and Lorain, Ohio on Saturday, June 28, 1924. At least 85 people were killed by the tornado, with others killed by tornadoes that struck the northern and eastern half of the state. It is the deadliest single tornado and tornado outbreak ever recorded in Ohio history, killing more people than the more well-known 1974 Xenia tornado during the 1974 Super Outbreak and the 1985 United States-Canadian tornado outbreak respectively, both of which were F5s.

Event summary

On that day, a low pressure system moved from Iowa towards Michigan and Ontario.  Temperatures were in the lower 80s across most of northern Ohio, which is typical for late-June across that area.

The tornado formed over the Sandusky Bay during the late afternoon hours and hit the city of Sandusky where it killed eight and destroyed 100 homes and 25 businesses. After moving east over Lake Erie for several miles, the tornado then struck the town of Lorain just west of Cleveland, killing 72.  Among the dead were 15 people inside a collapsed theater, which makes it the worst tornado-related death toll from a single building in Ohio. Eight people were also killed inside the Bath House near the location where the tornado came onshore.

Over 500 homes were destroyed and 1000 others were damaged in the Lorain area as well as every business in the downtown area. Damage amounts were estimated at the time to be approximately $12 million.  When adjusted for wealth the figure jumps to $1 billion (1997 dollars), which ranks it 10th costliest tornado, ahead of the Oklahoma City area tornado in 1999. A total of 85 were killed with additional deaths outside the two cities and 300 others were injured. While the Fujita scale was not existent at the time, the damage was estimated to be at around F4.

There are still some uncertainties on whether the Sandusky-Lorain tornado was a single tornado event due to the 25-mile path of the storm across Lake Erie between Sandusky and Lorain, however many eyewitnesses showed a single severe storm crossing the Lake before coming on-shore again just after 5:00 PM.

At the time, it was the second deadliest tornado ever in the northern United States behind the New Richmond Tornado in northern Wisconsin in 1899 and 13th overall. Today, it is still ranked as the fourth deadliest tornado in the northern States and 24th overall.

Other tornadoes hit the Castalia (Sandusky County), Huron Township (Erie County) and Geauga Lake (Portage County); additional tornadoes struck northwestern Pennsylvania, producing damage near Erie and Meadville. At least five other people were killed by tornadoes other than the Sandusky-Lorain storm including three others in Ohio.

Reporting on the 1924 Tornado 
The New York Times published the following article on June 29, 1924:

"CLEVELAND, June 28 (Associated Press) - Three hundred are dead and at least 1,500 are injured in Lorain alone as a result of a tornado today, according to reports reaching Colonel D. H. Pond, Director of Red Cross civilian relief, here early tonight. Colonel Pond announced that he had arranged for tents for 1,000 persons to be shipped directly to Lorain from Camp Perry.

Eighty dead have been taken from the State Theatre (sic) in Lorain, the chief of police of Elyria reported at 9:30 to-night. Estimates of 300 dead and 1,500 injured are not exaggerated.

The storm carried telegraph and telephone wires down with it, isolating Sandusky, Lorain and other points in the norther part of the State, making confirmation of reports impossible.

A motorist who drove from Loraine (sic) notified the Cleveland Plain Dealer that not only was East Lorain demolished, but the city of Lorain itself was swept away.

Reports received over crippled railroad wires from Sandusky late tonight state that between fifty and seventy-five persons were killed or drowned there today when the tornado struck that city. The Sandusky water works and several large buildings along the lake front were blown down.

Considerable damage along the shore line east of Cedar Point is reported. Some Summer homes are said to have been blown down and several persons killed.

Martial Law Declared in Lorain

An automobile ferry plying between Sandusky and Marblehead broke loose from its moorings at Sandusky and struck a pier. Fifteen passengers on the ferry are reported to have been drowned.

Martial law has been declared in Lorain by Mayor George Hoffman. Police deputized American Legion members to cooperate with them and the National Guard. Looting is said to be going on freely.

Lorain is without water, light, telephones, and food, and has little gas.

First reports received here from a staff correspondent of The Plain Dealer, who motored back to the first available telephone east of Lorain, were to the effect that 200 were killed in the collapse of the State Theatre at Lorain, and that forty other were dead in other parts of the city.

Reports from various other sources place the number of the dead as high as 500.

Rain continued to fall in Lorain for several hours.

Confirmation of the collapse of the theatre and washout of the Black River bridge at Lorain was brought to Cleveland by A. Downer, conductor on the Lake Shore Electric Railway, the first eyewitness of the disaster to reach this city. Many women and children were killed, motorists told him.

Practically every house on Broadway, the main street of the city east and west, was blown down, Downer reported, and automobiles were picked up and overturned on the sidewalks.

Eyewitness Describes Scene

The American Shipyards at Lorain are reported to have been razed. Two boats belonging to Henry Ford were reported to have broken loose.

Reports here that small passenger steamers plying between Sandusky and Lake Erie Island resorts have been lost, but could not be confirmed late tonight.

One of the first eyewitness stories of the cyclone to reach Cleveland was brought back by L.F. Forster of Bay Village. He was in Lorain within a few minutes after the cyclone struk and he walked over several blocks of the devastated area, saw unroofed buildings, fallen trees, and telephone poles, heard screams of some of the injured and afterward saw refugees fleeing the city.

"My wife and I and a party of friends were driving toward Lorain," he said. "It must have been 5:30 when the storm struck. We were about three or four miles east of the city and a heavy rain was falling."

Saw Fires in Wrecked Town.

"At a gasoline station we met another automobile that had stopped there. It had just come from Lorain and from the man and woman in it we learned there had been a cyclone. They said they had seen houses toppling over, roofs flying through the air, and trees and telephone poles mowed down as a by a huge scythe.

"Their car was a sedan. They said the wind blew so hard that they had to sit on the floor to keep it from shattering their ear drums.

"We drove on toward Lorain until a tangle of fallen trees made further progress impossible. Then we got out and walked into the town.

"The town was a wreck. I had an uncanny feeling as I looked at houses without roofs or without walls, as I picked my way through the wreckage in the streets.

"I recall looking into one house from which the front wall had been blown out. I could see into the bedrooms and noticed the beds stood there neatly made. In the distance we could see some houses in flames, although there appeared to be no general conflagration.

"The river bridge was demolished except for the footpath, which was still standing. People were running about excitedly in the streets, some of them with injured hands and legs. Many had been pinned under falling buildings and trees.

"One wall of a grocery had been demolished, and the merchandise was scattered over the street. We saw a moving picture theatre which had collapsed. The balcony had fallen across the doorway. Whether anybody was in the theatre or not I do not know. Some men were trying to reach any injured who might be inside.

"We left this scene of desolation and retracted our steps to the car. Driving back to Bay Village, we overtook a number of refugees who came pouring out of the city a few minutes after the storm struck.

"One of these was a man who said he owned a four-family apartment house which had been wrecked. Two people were found buried in the debris, he said.

"We met a man hurrying toward Lorain, who besought us for news. He said his wife and family were in the wrecked area. Ambulances and automobiles were rushing storm victims to the Elyria Hospital."

First Relief Train is Blocked. Nickel Plate trainmen reported that all the Government houses north of the railroad tracks in South Lorain had been blown down. Two men were killed there and thousands of dollars worth of property damaged.

Property damage at Akron, Ohio, was estimated at more than $1,000,000. FCleveland companies of the Ohio National Guard were being assembled in anticipation of orders to proceed to Lorain after messengers brought word that troops were wanted to aid in the relief work and preserve order.

About fifty members of the 112th Engineers Corps were rushed to Lorain in taxicabs upon receipt of Governor Donahey's orders. They were in charge of Colonel Ralph R. White. A Nickel Plate train is ready to take the rest of the troops as soon as they can be mobilized.

The first relief train sent from here by the Nickel Plate Railroad reached East Lorain late tonight, but could not proceed to Lorain because of the bad condition of the tracks, the Nickel Plate dispatched announced. A second Nickel Plate train is due at Lorain at 11 P.M. The first relief train made no report of the conditions found at Lorain.

A relief train was sent to the scene by the Nickel Plate Railroad, while all police emergency cars and other available automobiles left here with nurses and physicians.

Rescuers Send Call for Help."

The Elyria fire department, which succeeded in reaching Lorain, sent out a frantic appeal for help, reporting that several hundreds were injured when the theatre collapsed.

A street in South Lorain also is reported to have been undermined. From Sandusky came reports that a car ferry blew over. Interurban service between here and Lorain, Sandusky, and intermediate points is at a standstill.

The entire Elyria Fire and Police Departments and ambulance equipment have been sent to Lorain.

The only way to reach Lorain from Cleveland is through Elyria, and roads are jammed with refugees headed away from Lorain and relief parties on the way there."

Marysville Journal-Tribune published the following article on May 14, 1925:

TORNADO HELP COSTS MILLION

Columbus, May 14. -- Financial report of the Ohio relief commission of the American Red cross.

[F]ormed after the disastrous tornado which devastated Northern Ohio last summer, has just been completed, and certified to national headquarters of the Red Cross by Ernest & Ernest. Cleveland accountants.

It shows total receipts and dis-bursements of $1,021,545.23.

See also
 List of North American tornadoes and tornado outbreaks

References

External links
 Lorain-Sandusky tornado damage gallery

F4 tornadoes by date
Lorain-Sandusky, Ohio,1924-06-28
Lorain-Sandusky tornado, 1924
Tornadoes in Ohio
Lorain-sandusky Tornado, 1924
Tornado, 1924 Lorain-Sandusky
Tornado, 1924 Lorain-Sandusky
Lorain, Ohio
1924 in Ohio
Lorain-Sandusky tornado